was an athletic stadium in Shinjuku, Tokyo, Japan.

It hosted the 1936 Emperor's Cup and the final game between Keio BRB and Bosung College was played there on June 21, 1936.

Defunct sports venues in Japan
Defunct football venues in Japan